Caprice is a Moscow-based Russian rock band. The group, led by Anton Brejestovski, is one of the best known exponents of darkwave music in Russia, and its releases are themed on the "music of elves".

Discography
 Зеркало 1996
 Elvenmusic 2001
 Songs of Innocence and Experience  2002
 The Evening of Iluvatar’s Children (Elvenmusic 2) 2003
 Sister Simplicity 2004
 Tales of the Uninvited (Elvenmusic 3) 2005
 Zerkalo (Зеркало) revised version 2006 including "Waltz" to the words of J.R.R. Tolkien
 Kywitt! Kywitt! 2007, Prikosnovenie;  reissued 2008 Shadowplay 
 Viola Floralis suite on La Nuit des Fees 2  2008 
 Six Secret Words 2009
 Think Caprice''' 2010
 Maskarad (ru) 2010
 Girdenwodan Part I  2012
 Girdenwodan Part II''  2014

References

1996 establishments in Russia
Musical groups established in 1996
Musical groups from Moscow
Russian musical groups